Frederick William Jowett (31 January 1864 – 1 February 1944) was a British Labour politician.

Early life
Jowett was born in Bradford, West Yorkshire, on 31 January 1864. He received little formal education and at the age of eight was working half-time at the local textile mill, moving to full-time work at the age of 13. In 1886, he was promoted to overlooker and after attending evening classes in weaving and design at Bradford Technical College (now the University of Bradford), was employed as a manager at the mill.

As a young man Jowett read the works of William Morris and in 1887 he joined the Socialist League. This organisation was won over to anarchism after 1889 and the Bradford branch subsequently disbanded, moving Jowett to instead join the Labour Electoral Association. Jowett was also a founding member of the Bradford Labour Union, a group formed to support strikers at the Manningham Mills in Bradford. Jowett was a Christian Socialist and was furious when local churchmen criticised the strikers. Jowett responded by helping form the "Bradford Labour Church" in the town.

Bradford City Council

In 1892 Jowett became the first socialist to be elected to Bradford City Council, although fellow Bradford ILP member Leonard Robinson had won an election unopposed to Manningham ward earlier in the year. A few months later Jowett founded a branch of the Independent Labour Party in Bradford. As a member of the council Jowett instigated several important reforms that were eventually imitated by other authorities. In 1904 Bradford became the first local authority in Britain to provide free school meals. Another successful campaign was the clearing of a slum area and replacing it with new houses. Jowett was also a supporter of reforming the 1834 Poor Law. He was elected as a Poor Law Guardian and attempted to improve the quality of the food given to the children in the Bradford Workhouse.

Member of parliament for Bradford West

In the 1900 general election Jowett was the Independent Labour Party candidate in Bradford West. His strong opposition to the Second Boer War may have cost him the election, as he only lost by 41 votes.

With the Boer War over, Jowett comfortably won the seat in the 1906 general election.  In the House of Commons Jowett attempted to persuade the government to introduce legislation that he had pioneered in Bradford, such as a school meals programme.  Jowett supported David Lloyd George in his attempts to introduce Old Age Pensions in 1908. However, he criticised the inadequate sums involved and the use of the Means Test.  During this period Jowett established himself as one of the leading left-wing figures in the House of Commons and in 1909 was elected Chairman of the Independent Labour Party.

Jowett was re-elected in the January 1910 and December 1910 general elections. In the Socialist Review Jowett suggested a new system of government. He argued that the Cabinet system should be abolished and replaced with committees representing all political parties. Jowett believed this would give more power to individual MPs. This proposal was unpopular with the leaders who felt it would undermine their power if the Labour Party formed the next government. This controversy brought Jowett into conflict with the party leader, Ramsay MacDonald.  In an attempt to maintain party unity, Jowett agreed to resign as party chairman.

Like many socialists Jowett opposed Britain's involvement in the First World War.  He supported those who resisted conscription and demanded heavy taxation on wartime profits. Jowett called on the British government to assume total control of the economy during the conflict. In the 1918 general election all those Labour MPs who opposed the war, including Jowett, Ramsay MacDonald, George Lansbury and Philip Snowden lost their seats.

Member of parliament for Bradford East

In the 1922 general election Jowett was elected for Bradford East.  When Ramsay MacDonald became Britain's first Labour Prime Minister in 1924, Jowett was appointed as First Commissioner of Works and was appointed a Privy Counsellor. One of his achievements as a minister was to obtain the money needed to repair and modernize 60,000 government built houses.

Jowett was defeated in the 1924 general election and while out of the House of Commons took the opportunity to consider the future policies of the Independent Labour Party.  In 1926 he produced a report Socialism in Our Time which argued for a national minimum income with full socialism as a long-term objective. Ramsay MacDonald refused to endorse the report and now out of line with the ILP decided to resign from the party.  Jowett returned to the House of Commons at the 1929 general election, but MacDonald did not offer him a place in his government. Jowett opposed the formation of the National Government and as a result lost his seat in the 1931 general election.  The following year Jowett and the Independent Labour Party disaffiliated from the Labour Party. 

Jowett stood again in Bradford East in 1935, this time as an ILP candidate, facing a Labour Party opponent, Wilfred Heywood.  He was ill during the campaign, so his ILP colleagues undertook almost all the activity.  Jowett beat Heywood, but saw a substantial reduction in his vote, and could only take second place.

Death and legacy

The Independent Labour Party opposed Britain's involvement in the Second World War. He was very critical of the way the government ran the country during the conflict. Jowett claimed that the government's Equality of Sacrifice policy was just propaganda and pointed out that workers' wages were falling well behind increasing prices.

Jowett died in Bradford on 1 February 1944, aged 80.

Footnotes

Works

 What Made Me a Socialist. Glasgow, Scotland: Strickland Press, 1941.

Further reading

 Fenner Brockway, Socialism Over Sixty Years: The Life of Jowett of Bradford. London: George Allen and Unwin, 1946.

External links
 
 ILP@120: Fred Jowett – ‘A great man of a new kind'

1864 births
1944 deaths
Independent Labour Party MPs
Independent Labour Party National Administrative Committee members
Labour Party (UK) MPs for English constituencies
Members of the Privy Council of the United Kingdom
Socialist League (UK, 1885) members
UK MPs 1906–1910
UK MPs 1910
UK MPs 1910–1918
UK MPs 1922–1923
UK MPs 1923–1924
UK MPs 1929–1931
Alumni of the University of Bradford
Councillors in Bradford
Chairs of the Labour Party (UK)
Members of Parliament for Bradford West